Snow in Brazil occurs yearly in the high plains of the country's South Region (comprising the states of Rio Grande do Sul, Santa Catarina, and Paraná). Elsewhere in the country it is a rare phenomenon but has been registered several times.

The phenomenon occurs mainly during the months of June, July and August. In this period, São Joaquim, the city with the most snow days, receives an average of 13,000 visitors from other parts of Brazil.

Snowfalls like this are extremely rare in Brazil, the two below being the only later snowfalls that reached (or passed) :

Often cited as the greatest snowfall in Brazil.
 15 June 1985, in Pico das Agulhas Negras, Itatiaia, Rio de Janeiro.  of snow.

By region

South
Due to the high latitude and large areas of high altitude, the South Region is easily the coldest in Brazil, with snow tending to occur every year in southern municipalities like São Joaquim (SC), Urubici (SC), Urupema (SC), and São José dos Ausentes (RS), as well as Bom Jesus (RS), Bom Jardim da Serra (SC), Cambará do Sul (RS), and Palmas (PR). Those are considered the coldest cities in the country.

 In 2000, snow occurred in more than 70 municipalities spread throughout the three states of the Southern Region. In 2010, the phenomenon returned to power in 21 municipalities of the Santa Catarina and Rio Grande mountains. In the year 2013, a historic episode in July brought snow to more than 140 cities in the region, including the country's coldest capital Curitiba (PR), which experienced snowfall once more after the last occurrence 38 years before and is home of 1.8 million inhabitants.

Other regions
Snow has been registered in the southeastern states of São Paulo (last time in Apiaí in 1975), Rio de Janeiro (last time at Itatiaia, at the Pico das Agulhas Negras, in 1985), and Minas Gerais. It has also been registered twice (1975 and 2013) in Paranhos, Mato Grosso do Sul, located in the Center-West. This totals seven states with snow reported in the country. 

The remaining states, including the whole regions of North and Northeast, have strong tropical and semi-arid climates and low latitude and altitude, making snow (virtually) impossible. There have been no reports of snow even at the highest point in the country, Pico da Neblina.

See also
São Joaquim - the Brazilian city with the most snow days
Urupema - lowest average temperatures for any Brazilian city
Climate of Brazil
Morro da Igreja
Lapse rate - About the rate of decrease of temperature with altitude.

References

External links

Report about the snow in Rio Grande do Sul, with historical data.
Acúmulo de neve em cidades de Santa Catarina chegou a 25 centímetros, diz meteorologista (Report of 2010-08-05 from O Globo, in Portuguese).

Brazil
Climate of Brazil
Water in Brazil